Seashell is an off-white color that resembles some of the very pale pinkish tones that are common in many seashells.

The first recorded use of seashell as a color name in English was in 1926.

In 1987, "seashell" was included as one of the X11 colors.

See also
List of colors

References

Shades of white